The LSU Natatorium is a swimming and diving facility located on the campus of Louisiana State University in Baton Rouge, LA.  The facility, built in 1985, serves as the home of the LSU Tigers and LSU Lady Tigers swimming and diving teams. The stadium has a seating capacity of 2,200. The Natatorium features a 50-meter pool, which can be converted into two 25-meter or 25-yard pools with the use of bulkheads and includes a championship diving well with one- and three-meter springboards and five-, seven- and 10-meter platforms.

The facility has played host to several national competitions, including the 1985 National Sports Festival, the 1986 Men's Southeastern Conference Championships, the 1987 NCAA Diving Regional and the U.S. Diving National Championships and the 1999 NCAA Regional Diving Championships.

Gallery

See also
LSU Tigers and Lady Tigers

References

External links
LSU Natatorium at LSUSports.net

College swimming venues in the United States
LSU Tigers and Lady Tigers swimming and diving venues
Sports venues in Louisiana
Swimming venues in Louisiana
Sports venues completed in 1985
1985 establishments in Louisiana